Bongo Mbutuma is a South African actor. He is best known for his roles in the popular serials District 9, Troy: Fall of a City and Mary and Martha.

Personal life
Mbutuma was born and raised in Cape Town. In 1999, he graduated from South African College Schools (SACS) High School in Cape Town. Then he attended CityVarsity, completing a course in Film and Television Production in 2001.

Career
Mbutuma appeared in a commercial for Momentum Life, which became very popular. In the commercial, he played a man who gets a car salesman to test drive a new car for him, while he sits in the back seat reading a newspaper.

In 2003 he joined the Gregg Watt Interactive Actors Workshop for further studies in cinema. Then in 2004, he received a contract with 'Arepp: Theatre For Life', where he was lucky to travels to schools with educational drama projects. After the contract, he made his first guest role on television, in the sci-fi series Charlie Jade. In 2005, he played several guest appearance in the serials Interrogation Room, Going Up Again and Laugh Out Loud. Then he appeared in the feature film Unrequited Love, which made his cinema debut.

In 2006, he played a minor role 'Hospital Gate Guard' in the international drama series ER. Then in 2007, he received his first television leading role in the SABC1 drama series Divers Down. In the serial, he played the role as 'Bafana'. In the meantime, he received several television commercials for Joko Tea, Momentum, BP and Nedbank. In 2010, he became the television host for the first season of the e.tv technology magazine show The Tech Report.

In 2014, he played a supportive role 'Detective Songezo Sibanda' in the eKasi+ and e.tv detective drama series Traffic!.

Filmography

References

External links
 

Living people
South African male television actors
South African male film actors
People from Cape Town
Year of birth missing (living people)